The Doha Zoo was a Zoological garden established in Qatar in February 1984. It was closed in 2012 for renovations, and originally scheduled for reopening in 2017.

References

Zoos in Asia
Doha
Buildings and structures in Doha
1984 establishments in Qatar
2013 disestablishments in Asia